Lavender Hill High School is a public secondary school located in Lavender Hill in the Cape Flats district of Cape Town, Western Cape, South Africa. 

The school is in one of the more economically-deprived areas of the Western Cape. The school features a library, gym, three computer rooms, kitchen, two sports fields and a hall. It employees 34 teachers along with 15 support staff in various roles such as administration and cleaning & maintenance. 

The official languages of the school are Afrikaans and English. Students are placed in either Afrikaans or English classes depending on their native tongue. The school also offers IsiXhosa as an additional language. 

In 2013 Sir Richard Branson visited the school to launch Virgin Active South Africa's FUTURE CREW programme, which encourages South African students to be more active. The company also assisted in funding the construction of a gym at the school

References

1978 establishments in South Africa
High schools in South Africa
Educational institutions established in 1978
Schools in Cape Town